Bruce—Briggs Brick Block is a historic rowhouse block located at Lancaster in Erie County, New York.  It is a mid-19th century brick structure unique in Western New York, which incorporates both Greek Revival and Italianate style decorative details.  The rowhouses were built for George Bruce, one of the early settlers of Lancaster.

It was listed on the National Register of Historic Places in 1999.  It is located in the Broadway Historic District.

References

External links
Bruce--Briggs Brick Block - U.S. National Register of Historic Places on Waymarking.com

Houses on the National Register of Historic Places in New York (state)
Italianate architecture in New York (state)
Houses completed in 1855
Houses in Erie County, New York
National Register of Historic Places in Erie County, New York
Historic district contributing properties in Erie County, New York